The Pineville Heist is a 2016 Canadian action film, directed and co-written by Lee Chambers and Todd Gordon. The film is based on the 2011 screenplay by Chambers and Gordon.

Plot
A teenager witnesses the aftermath of a bank heist when he witnesses the murder of one of the robbers. In the chaos, he gets away with their loot and hides with his drama teacher in the high school as one of the robbers tracks him.

Cast
Basil Hoffman – Principal Parker
Presley Massara – Aaron Stevens
Carl Bailey – Sheriff Tremblay
Jacob Brown – Mike
Wayne V. Johnson – Derek Stevens
Darryl Dougherty – Officer Carl Smith
Vince Groulx – Chuck
Priscilla-Anne Jacob – Amanda Becker

Awards

References

External links

Canadian action films
English-language Canadian films
2010s English-language films
2010s Canadian films